Severskaya is a rural locality (a stanitsa) and the administrative center of Seversky District of Krasnodar Krai, Russia. Population:

References

Rural localities in Krasnodar Krai
Populated places in Seversky District
Kuban Oblast